Michael William Langan, (Bill Langan), (June 9, 1955 – December 31, 2010) was an American yacht designer who practiced his trade in New York City and Newport, Rhode Island. His designs, both as chief designer at Sparkman & Stephens and later as the principal at Langan Design, numbered in the hundreds.

Career
Having obtained his engineering degree at Webb Institute he was accepted for an internship at Sparkman & Stephens. Noticed by Olin Stephens he was hired shortly after his graduation, named in 1980 by Olin as chief designer, a position he held until his departure in 1996.

In 1997 Bill created his own design firm in Newport, RI which he ran until his  passing at the end of 2010. The Langan Design firm is now owned and operated by his former associates.

Designs

Sparkman & Stephens

During his time at Sparkman & Stephens Bill Langan was responsible for the design of hundreds of vessels of all sizes. The following is a selection of vessels that were built under his watch:

 Freedom, winner of the 1980 America's Cup
 Itasca, refit in 1994. Owned by Bill Simon, former  Secretary of the Treasury of the U.S.,  Itasca was the first private yacht to complete the traverse of the Northwest Passage in a single season. Bill Langan was on board for the trip.
 Victoria of Strathearn, 91' ketch

Langan Design

The following is a selection of vessels that were built under his watch while working at Langan Design:

 Victoria of Strathearn, 130' ketch 
 Sagamore, Line honors, Bermuda Race 2000
 Argo 
 Spirit of Bermuda
 Eos
 M/Y Calliope

References

External links 
 Official site of Langan Design

American yacht designers
1955 births
2010 deaths